Audi Sportpark ( is a 15,800-capacity stadium in Ingolstadt, Germany. It is primarily used for football and is the home of FC Ingolstadt 04.

References

External links

Stadium information 
Stadium picture

FC Ingolstadt 04
Football venues in Germany
Sports venues in Bavaria
Buildings and structures in Ingolstadt